This is a list of cricketers who played List A cricket for Kent Cricket Board (KCB). The side, which was made up of recreational club players, played 13 List A cricket matches in knock-out competitions between 1999 and 2003 and competed in other competitions organised by the England and Wales Cricket Board between 1998 and 2003. The team won eight List A matches, reaching the third round of the competition each season in which they played. As well as six victories against other Cricket Board teams, they beat Buckinghamshire County Cricket Club, a Minor Counties team, in 2001 and Denmark, an ICC Trophy side at the time, in 1999. In each season they were defeated by first-class counties, losing to Hampshire three times, and Warwickshire and Derbyshire once.

This is a list of the players who appeared in the List A matches the side played. Many players also played for the side in Minor Counties Trophy matches and for other sides in a range of competitions. Only their List A appearances for KCB are shown here.

A

B

D

F

G

H

J

L

M

R

S

T

W

Notes

References

Kent Cricket Board